Usha Sharma served as the Director General of the Archaeological Survey of India from 2017 - 2020. She is a 1985-batch IAS officer of Rajasthan cadre, has been appointed Director General of the  Archaeological Survey of India (ASI), an order issued by the Department of Personnel and Training (DoPT) on 22 July 2017. Within a year from her appointment, a new headquarters building (Dharohar Bhawan) was acquired by Archaeological Survey of India (ASI) which was inaugurated by Prime Minister Narendra Modi on 12 July 2018. Two major contributions started during her term were the restoration efforts conducted to the Natamandap of Jagannath Temple in Odisha and the conservation efforts of the Jagamohan of Sun Temple in Konark. She was succeeded by Smt. V.Vidyawati in 2020.She is one of the most successful I.A.S officers and she belongs to a brahmin family not to mention from general category. She would have become I.A.S officer at the age of 23 to 25 to reach such a high post in Indian government or any State government. She got retired in the year 2020. Currently she is the Chief Secretary of Rajasthan

References

20th-century Indian historians
Directors General of the Archaeological Survey of India
Living people
Year of birth missing (living people)